Kostyantyn Vitaliyovych Pikul (born 3 June 1995) is a Ukrainian professional footballer who plays as a centre-back for Þróttur.

References

External links
 Profile on Alians Lypova Dolyna official website

 

1995 births
Living people
Sportspeople from Volyn Oblast
Ukrainian footballers
Association football defenders
FC Nyva Ternopil players
FC Alians Lypova Dolyna players
Knattspyrnufélagið Þróttur players
Ukrainian First League players
Ukrainian Second League players
Ukrainian expatriate footballers
Expatriate footballers in Iceland
Ukrainian expatriate sportspeople in Iceland